The 2017 Colonial Athletic Association women's basketball tournament was a postseason event was held from March 8–11, 2017 at the JMU Convocation Center in Harrisonburg, Virginia. Elon won their first CAA Women's Basketball Tournament in school history and earn an automatic trip to the NCAA women's tournament.

Seeds
Due to the revelation that Charleston had supplied improperly sized basketballs in its home conference wins over William & Mary and UNCW, the CAA announced on February 2 that those games would be treated as Charleston losses for purposes of CAA tournament seeding, although they still count as Charleston wins for all other purposes.

Schedule

Bracket

See also
 2017 CAA men's basketball tournament

References

External links
 2017 CAA Women's Basketball Championship

Colonial Athletic Association women's basketball tournament
Tournament
CAA women's basketball tournament
Sports in Harrisonburg, Virginia
College basketball tournaments in Virginia
CAA women's basketball tournament
Women's sports in Virginia